The cross-country skiing competition of the Vancouver 2010 Paralympics were held at Whistler, British Columbia. The events were held between 14 and 21 March 2010.

Medal table

Events
The program included a total of 20 events, 10 for men and 10 for women. Competitors are divided into three categories: standing, visually impaired, and sitting. Standing skiers are those that have a locomotive disability but are able to use the same equipment as able-bodied skiers, whereas sitting competitors use a sitski. Visually impaired skiers compete with the help of a sighted guide. The skier with the visual impairment and the guide are considered a team, and dual medals are awarded.

Men
 1 km sprint
 Sitting
 Standing
 Visually impaired
 10 km individual
 Sitting
 Standing
 Visually impaired
 15 km individual
 Sitting
 20 km individual
 Standing
 Visually impaired
 1 × 4 km + 2 × 5 km relay

Women
 1 km sprint
 Sitting
 Standing
 Visually impaired
 5 km individual
 Sitting
 Standing
 Visually impaired
 10 km individual
 Sitting
 15 km individual
 Standing
 Visually impaired
 3×2.5 km relay

Women's events

Men's events

Competition schedule
All times are Pacific Standard Time (UTC-8).

See also
Cross-country skiing at the 2010 Winter Olympics

References 

– About the Sport 
Cross-country Schedule and Results 
Official Results Book – Cross-Country Skiing – 14 to 21 March , Vancouver 2010

 
2010
2010 Winter Paralympics events
Winter Paralympics